The 1981 NCAA Division III football season, part of college football in the United States organized by the National Collegiate Athletic Association at the Division III level, began in August 1981, and concluded with the NCAA Division III Football Championship in December 1981 at Garrett-Harrison Stadium in Phenix City, Alabama. The Widener Pioneers won their second Division III championship, defeating the defending national champion Dayton Flyers by a final score of 17−10.

Conference standings

Conference champions

Postseason
The 1981 NCAA Division III Football Championship playoffs were the ninth annual single-elimination tournament to determine the national champion of men's NCAA Division III college football. The championship game was held at Garrett-Harrison Stadium in Phenix City, Alabama for the ninth consecutive year. Like the previous six championships, eight teams competed in this edition.

Playoff bracket

See also
1981 NCAA Division I-A football season
1981 NCAA Division I-AA football season
1981 NCAA Division II football season
1981 NAIA Division I football season
1981 NAIA Division II football season

References